Alexandre Arquillière (1870–1953) was a French stage and film actor.

Selected filmography
 Zigomar (1911)
 Zigomar Contre Nick Carter (1912)
 Zigomar the Eelskin (1913)
 The Cameo (1913)
 La folie du doute (1920)
 La Souriante Madame Beudet (1922)
 The End of the Day (1939)

References

Bibliography
 Waldman, Harry. Maurice Tourneur: The Life and Films. McFarland, 2001.

External links

1870 births
1953 deaths
French male film actors
French male silent film actors
20th-century French male actors
French male stage actors